The La Comunidad Mexicana Israelita El Neguev "Venta Prieta" (English: El Neguev Mexican Israelite Community of Venta Prieta), better known as the Jewish Community of Venta Prieta is a Jewish community in the city of Pachuca de Soto, Hidalgo, Mexico. The community is made up of people who are descended from B'nei Anusim, also known as Conversos, Jews who were either forcibly converted to Christianity during the Spanish Inquisition and later returned to Judaism.

It is a small congregation, of which many view themselves as either Sephardic Jews (due to a family history coming from Spain to Mexico) or as descendents of one of the lost tribes of Israel. The synagogue was founded in 1930 by the Téllez brothers and today run by the Téllez family. For many years, Rabbi Samuel S. Lerer was the educational and organizational leader of the community until his retirement in 1999.

It is said that the community was founded between the end of the 19th century and 1920, by María Trinidad, a widow of one of the Téllez brothers. Maria viewed herself as a descendant of the Anusim, and (according to tradition) arrived in Michoacán with her mother and twelve children escaping a religious revolt (possibly the Cristero War), that was occurring during that period. Maria reportedly kept the customs of her ancestors, including refraining from eating pork, ceasing work on Friday and praying only to HaShem.

The name Venta Prieta, originated in the 1920s as the name of the neighborhood. The word Venta comes from the vendor stalls along the side of the road, as  the area lies on the road from Pachuca to Mexico City and Actopan, Hidalgo. Prieta described the soot from charcoal used in cooking as well as the black soil of the area.

References

Bibliography 

 Los judíos en México: una historia con énfasis especial en el período de 1857 a 1930.Corinne Azen Krause, Ariela Katz de Gugenheim. Universidad Iberoamericana, January 1, 1987
 A Travel Guide to the Jewish Caribbean and Latin America. Frank, Ben G.Pelican Publishing
 Return to Centro Histórico: A Mexican Jew Looks for His Roots. Ilan Stavans. Rutgers University Press, 30 December 2011.

History of Hidalgo (state)
Pachuca
New Christians (moriscos and conversos)
Religious persecution
Crypto-Jews
Jewish Mexican history
Synagogues in Mexico